Eloisa Coiro (born 1 December 2000) is an Italian sprinter, specialized in the 400 metres.

Career
She competed in the women's 4×400 metres event at the 2021 European Athletics Indoor Championships.

Achievements
Senior level

National records
 4×400 metres relay indoor: 3:30.32 ( Toruń, 7 March 2021 with Rebecca Borga, Alice Mangione, Eleonora Marchiando) Current holder

References

External links

2000 births
Living people
Italian female sprinters
Athletes from Rome
Athletics competitors of Fiamme Azzurre
21st-century Italian women
Athletes (track and field) at the 2022 Mediterranean Games
Mediterranean Games medalists in athletics
Mediterranean Games silver medalists for Italy